Worra is a surname. Notable people with the surname include:

Bryan Thao Worra (born 1973), Laotian American writer
Travis Worra (born 1993), American soccer player